Ousmane Sonko (born 12 october  1974) is a Senegalese politician. He is a former chief tax inspector in Senegal, and an advocate for reformation in the Senegalese tax system. Sonko was the youngest candidate to run in the 2019 presidential election in Senegal when he challenged the incumbent president, Macky Sall. He is the author of three books. Sonko is seen by many as a rising opposition leader in Senegalese politics to Macky Sall.

Early life
Ousmane Sonko was born in Thiès, Senegal, and spent his childhood in Sébikotane (near Dakar), and Casamance. His father is from Casamance and his mother is from Khombole.

Sonko received a baccalaureate in 1993, and in 1999 a master's degree in Juridical Science, specializing in public law, from Gaston Berger University of Saint-Louis, Senegal.

Career
After Sonko obtained his master's degree he attended the National School of Administration and Judiciary (ENAM). Sonko spent 15 years of service as a tax specialist.

Sonko is the president of the political party PASTEF-Les Patriotes "Patriots of Senegal for Ethics, Work and Fraternity", which was created in 2014. He is also the elected deputy of the NDAWI ASKAN WI / People’s Alternative coalition in the National Assembly.

In 2016 Sonko was a tax inspector-turned-whistleblower. He exposed corrupt practices such as offshore tax havens by the Senegalese elite, such as a $50 million mineral sands processing plant. SNC Lavalin-Mauritius Ltd, a Canadian company used a shell so as to avoid paying an estimated $8.9 million in taxes. He was terminated as a result of his activism.

Sonko is the author of the Pétrole et gaz au Sénégal, published in 2017. The book chronicles the Petro-Tim affair scandals. In 2018 he authored a second book titled "Solutions".

Sonko ran for president in the 2019 election in Senegal as a tax justice candidate. Sonko wants Senegal, which still uses the French franc (along with seven other Francophone countries in West Africa) to eventually replace the franc with a domestic currency. "Sonko proposes a gradual, prudent and responsible exit from the franc CFA monetary system that is holding our economies hostage" according to Pastef Partie activist Mamadou Yauck.

In the presidential election of February 24, 2019, Macky Sall was re-elected, winning 58% of the vote. Sonko came in third place with 16%. During the election run-up (and just prior to election day) Sonko was targeted repeatedly with anonymous smears utilizing fake documents and false claims aimed at discrediting his character.

Sonko was arrested near Cheikh Anta Diop University on March 3, 2021, and charged with disturbing the public order. He was on his way to court to defend himself against rape charges, which he and his supporters say are politically motivated.

In May 2021, Senegalese justice refused to Ousmane Sonko the authorization to leave the territory to go abroad while he is under judicial control since his indictment for rape in March 2021.

In September 2021, Ousmane Sonko launches the coalition "Yewwi askan wi" ("Free the people" in Wolof language), This coalition aims according to its initiators to conquer the municipal and departmental councils, almost all controlled by the presidential coalition since the March 2014 elections.

He was elected Mayor of Ziguinchor in the 2022 Senegalese local elections.

Protests
Protests started on March 3. The arrest of Ousmane Sonko on March 4 led to clashes between the police and student protestors in Dakar and in Bignona. Thirteen people died during the protests. A teenager in Diaobe, Vélingara Department became the fifth fatal victim on March 6. Some view the rape accusation against Sonko as dubious because criminal charges have been used to stifle opposition in the past.

On March 4, 2021, a protest was held at the United Nations headquarters in New York City by Senegalese New Yorkers to demand Sonko's release from prison.

Alioune Badara Cissé, mediator of the republic, called on the government to stop threats and intimidation, and he called upon demonstrators to end violence and looting, warning on March 7 that, "we are on the verge of an apocalypse". The Economic Community of West African States (ECOWAS) has called for restraint and calm as well as guarantees of the right to protest. Sonko supporters have called for three more days of protest, starting March 8.

Some believe President Mackey is trying to eliminate opposition leading up to the 2024 election, and that he may change the constitution in order to make himself eligible for a third term, as was recently done in Guinea and the Ivory Coast.

References

External links
Paradise Papers: The True Story Behind The Secret Nine-Month Investigation (HBO)

Living people
1974 births
Senegalese politicians
21st-century Senegalese writers
Senegalese diplomats
Senegalese democracy activists
People from Thiès Region
Mayors of places in Senegal